Kevin Wayne McLain (born September 15, 1954) is a former American football linebacker in the National Football League (NFL). He was a 1st round selection (26th overall pick) in the 1976 NFL Draft out of Colorado State University. McLain played for the Los Angeles Rams from 1976–1979.

References 

Sportspeople from Tulsa, Oklahoma
Players of American football from Oklahoma
American football linebackers
Colorado State Rams football players
Los Angeles Rams players
All-American college football players
1954 births
Living people
Fullerton Hornets football players